The Men's 25K race at the 2006 FINA World Open Water Swimming Championships was swum on Sunday, September 3, 2006 in Naples, Italy. It was the sixth and final event of the 2006 Open Water Worlds. 16 males were entered in the event, 15 of whom swam.

Results
All times in hours : minutes : seconds

See also
2004 FINA World Open Water Swimming Championships – Men's 25K
Open water swimming at the 2007 World Aquatics Championships – Men's 25 km
2008 FINA World Open Water Swimming Championships – Men's 25K

References

Fina World Open Water Swimming Championships - Mens 25k, 2006
World Open Water Swimming Championships